Jiří Hudec (born 15 August 1964) is a retired male track and field athlete from the Czech Republic who competed in the 110 metres hurdles. He won three medals at the European Athletics Indoor Championships, representing Czechoslovakia before it split up. Born in Brno, he twice represented his nation at the World Championships in Athletics, entering in 1987 and 1991.

His personal bests are 13.48 seconds in the 110 metres hurdles (+1.4 m/s; Rome 1987) and 7.60 seconds in the 60 metres hurdles (Karlsruhe 1989).

International competitions

1Did not finish in the final

References

1964 births
Living people
Czech male hurdlers
Czechoslovak male hurdlers
Athletes (track and field) at the 1988 Summer Olympics
Olympic athletes of Czechoslovakia
Sportspeople from Brno
World Athletics Championships athletes for Czechoslovakia
World Athletics Championships athletes for the Czech Republic
Competitors at the 1987 Summer Universiade